Nicholas Sturgeon (ca. 1380s – between 31 May and 8 June 1454) was a Canon of Windsor from 1442 to 1454, a composer and a compiler of the Old Hall Manuscript.

Career

Sturgeon was educated at Winchester College, where he was elected a scholar in 1399, and New College, Oxford. He accompanied King Henry V as chaplain whilst on campaign in France in 1415. He held several canonries, and served as a member of the Royal House Chapel.

He was appointed:
Rector of Fulham 1439 - 1452
Rector of Allerton, Somerset
Rector of Wraxall, Somerset
Rector of Avening, Worcestershire
Custos of the Free Chapel, near Weare (Allerton)
Prebendary of Reculverland in St Paul's 1440 - 1452
Prebendary of Kentish Town in St Paul's 1452 - 1454
Precentor of St Paul's Cathedral 1442 - 1454
Prebendary of Hasilbury in Wells 
Prebendary of Exeter

He was appointed to the eighth stall in St George's Chapel, Windsor Castle in 1442 and held the canonry until 1454.

References 

1380s births
1454 deaths
Canons of Windsor
English composers
Alumni of New College, Oxford
People educated at Winchester College